Nikaia is a town and a former municipality in the Larissa regional unit, Thessaly, Greece. Located 4 km south of Larissa city, it forms a part of Larissa's metropolitan area, that lies in the Thessalian plain. Since the 2011 local government reform it is part of the municipality Kileler, of which it is the seat and a municipal unit. Population 6,535 (2011). The municipal unit has an area of 279.562 km2.

References

Populated places in Larissa (regional unit)